The Bankruptcy (Scotland) Act 2016 is an Act of the Scottish Parliament. It forms the key legislative provisions behind the law of bankruptcy in Scotland, with the different Parts of the Act generally following the steps one would take to sequestrate oneself in Scotland.

The Act did not change the law in Scotland, but instead consolidated and codified the provisions of a number of Acts relating to bankruptcy, including the Bankruptcy (Scotland) Acts 1985 and 1993, as well as the Bankruptcy and Debt Advice (Scotland) Act 2014.

Further reading

References 

Acts of the Scottish Parliament 2016